Bimbam may refer to:

Chandra Bimbam, a 1980 Indian Malayalam film
Paulinka Bimbam, a character from Charlotte Salomon (opera) 
 R&B band "Bimbam" formed by Tony Bellamy and Butch Rillera

See also
Bim Bam
Bim-Bam
Bim and Bam